The National Dance Award of Spain is an annual prize awarded by the Ministry of Culture since 1988 and regulated by the Royal Decree of 1995, along with the rest of the country's National Awards. It is granted by a jury and, since 2000, in two categories: Creation and Performance. Each confers a monetary prize of €30,000 (originally 2,000 pesetas).

Recipients

References

External links
  

1988 establishments in Spain
Awards established in 1988
Dance awards
Dance in Spain
Spanish awards